Gaetano Chiaveri ( in Rome – 5 March 1770) was an Italian architect and master builder, most notable for his work as part of the second phase of the Dresden Baroque. His works include the Cathedral in Dresden and a new wing of the Royal Castle in Warsaw. In the Russian Empire, he oversaw the construction of the Kadriorg Palace to Nicola Michetti's designs.

1689 births
1770 deaths
Italian Baroque architects
18th-century Italian architects
German Baroque architects
Polish Baroque architects
Russian Baroque architects
Architects from Rome